Sơn Hà is a rural district (huyện) of Quảng Ngãi province in the South Central Coast region of Vietnam. As of 2003 the district had a population of 64,398. The district covers an area of 750 km². The district capital lies at Di Lăng.

References

Districts of Quảng Ngãi province